High School DxD is a light novel series written by Ichiei Ishibumi and illustrated by Miyama-Zero. It has been published in Dragon Magazine since September 20, 2008 under the Fujimi Fantasia Bunko imprint. The series follows Issei Hyodo, a lecherous high school student attending Kuoh Academy who is killed on his first date. He is later brought back to life as a devil by Rias Gremory, a beautiful crimson-haired girl who is the heiress of the Gremory Family of devils and President of the Occult Research Club, and must work his way to the top so that he may one day fulfill his dream of building a harem. The first volume of High School DxD was released by Fujimi Shobo on September 20, 2008.

Ishibumi has grouped the light novels into story arcs. The first arc, titled The Red Dragon Emperor's Awakening (赤龍帝覚醒 Sekiryūtei Kakusei), ran through the first two volumes. Birth of the Breast Dragon Emperor (乳龍帝誕生 Chichiryūtei Tanjō) is the second story arc and follows volumes three through six. The Heroic Oppai Dragon (英雄（ヒーロー）おっぱいドラゴン Hīrō Oppai Doragon) follows volumes seven through twelve.[LN 12 afterword] The fourth arc, The Legend of Oppai Dragon and his Lively Companions (おっぱいドラゴンと愉快な仲間たちの伝説 Oppai Doragon to Yukaina Nakamatachi no Densetsu), follows volumes fourteen through twenty-one. [LN 14 afterword] The fifth arc, Red Dragon Emperor of the Blazing Truth × White Dragon Emperor of the Morning Star: The True Dragon(s) of the Kuoh Academy (燚誠の赤龍帝×明星の白龍皇 -駒王学園の真なる龍（ハイスクールD×D）), starts at volume twenty-two and is the final arc of the series; ending at volume twenty -five. The author has announced a sequel to the series is to be released fall 2018. The light novels also feature a series of side stories set in between the main storyline, and are often compiled into volumes. So far, three short story collections (Volume 8, Volume 13 and Volume 15) have been published. As of March 20, 2018, twenty five volumes have been released under their Fujimi Fantasia Bunko imprint. Individual chapters of the novels are called "Lives".

A manga adaptation illustrated by Hiroji Mishima began serialization in the July 2010 issue of Dragon Magazine, and later in Monthly Dragon Age in its March 2011 issue. The first volume was published by Fujimi Shobo on June 9, 2011, with a total of seven volumes available in Japan as of December 8, 2014 under their Dragon Comics Age imprint. A spinoff manga, called , illustrated by Hiroichi, was serialized in Monthly Dragon Age from the October 2011 issue (Released on September 9, 2011) to the April 2012 issue (Released on March 9, 2012). Serving as a side story, the manga takes place after chapter 10 of the main manga, and centers on Asia Argento's first duties as a Devil. It was later released as a tankōbon volume on March 9, 2012. Yen Press had licensed the spin-off for an English release and released the volume on December 16, 2014. A second spin-off series, titled , began in the April issue of Monthly Dragon Age. Illustrated by SODA, it adapts the short stories found in the light novels.

Volume list

High School DxD light novels

Shin High School DxD

High School DxD DX

High School DxD manga

See also
 Ichiei Ishibumi
 Characters
 Episodes

References

External links
 Official website 

High School DXD
High School DXD
L